Paulina Barzycka (born 18 March 1986) is a retired Polish swimmer who won two bronze medals at European Aquatics Championships, short course (2005) and long course (2006). She also competed in four freestyle events at the 2004 and 2008 Summer Olympics. Her best achievement was fourth place in the 200 m freestyle in 2004, missing a bronze medal by 0.17 seconds.

Barzycka started swimming by chance – her physician recommended exercises in water to correct a spine defect. This defect troubled her later and had to be operated in January 2008, before her second Olympics. She retired after the games to become a swimming coach.

She graduated from the Academy of Physical Education in Biała Podlaska.

References

External links
2008.nbcolympics profile

1986 births
Swimmers at the 2004 Summer Olympics
Swimmers at the 2008 Summer Olympics
Polish female freestyle swimmers
Living people
Olympic swimmers of Poland
Sportspeople from Lublin
European Aquatics Championships medalists in swimming
21st-century Polish women